Hilcona AG is a food processing company in Liechtenstein and one of the most important employers in the country. The company was founded by Toni Hilti in 1935 and operates from its headquarters in Schaan, the most populous town of Liechtenstein. Two of Toni Hilti's brothers, Eugen and Martin Hilti, would later found the power tool maker Hilti in 1941. In 1961 Hilcona began with the production of frozen food which makes up for 63% of Hilcona's revenue today. Since 2017 Bell Food Group holds 100% of all stakes in Hilcona. The company operates two production plants, one in Liechtenstein and one in Switzerland, and sells its products in nine different countries in Europe.

See also

 Economy of Liechtenstein

References

Food companies of Liechtenstein
Brands of Liechtenstein
Schaan